Thomas or Tom Bradshaw may refer to:

Sportspeople
Harry Bradshaw (footballer, born 1873) (1873–1899), also known as Thomas, association footballer of the 1890s for England, Northwich Victoria, Liverpool, Tottenham Hotspur and Thames Ironworks
Tom Bradshaw (footballer, born 1879) (1879–1930), English association footballer of the 1890s and 1900s for Blackpool, Sunderland and Nottingham Forest
Tom Bradshaw (footballer, born 1904) (1904–1986), Scottish association footballer of the 1920s and 1930s for Scotland, Bury, Liverpool and Third Lanark
Tom Bradshaw (footballer, born 1992), Wales international footballer
Tommy Bradshaw (c. 1918–1981), rugby league footballer of the 1940s and 1950s for Great Britain, England, and Wigan

Others
Thomas Bradshaw (poet) ( 1591), English poet
Thomas Bradshaw (postmaster) (1859–1934), Australian postmaster
 Thomas Bradshaw, victim of the Lynching of Thomas Bradshaw in 1927
Tom Bradshaw (musician) (born 1935), American steel guitar player
Thomas Bradshaw (playwright), American dramatist
Thomas W. Bradshaw (born 1938), North Carolina politician
Thomas Bradshaw (MP) (1733–1774), British civil servant and politician